The Man with the Fake Banknote or The Man with the Counterfeit Money (German: Der Mann mit der falschen Banknote) is a 1927 German silent crime film directed by Romano Mengon and starring Nils Asther, Vivian Gibson and Margarete Lanner.

The film's art direction was by Robert A. Dietrich.

Cast
 Nils Asther  
 Vivian Gibson
 Margarete Lanner 
 Sig Arno 
 Philipp Manning
 Karl Platen

References

Bibliography
 Hans-Michael Bock and Tim Bergfelder. The Concise Cinegraph: An Encyclopedia of German Cinema. Berghahn Books.
 Grange, William. Cultural Chronicle of the Weimar Republic. Scarecrow Press, 2008.

External links

1927 films
Films of the Weimar Republic
Films directed by Romano Mengon
German silent feature films
1927 crime films
German crime films
German black-and-white films
Counterfeit money in film
1920s German films